Ray Cawley (born 1944) is an Irish retired Gaelic footballer who played as a goalkeeper for the Cork senior football team.

Born in Cork, Cawley first played competitive football during his schooling at Coláiste Chríost Rí. He arrived on the inter-county scene at the age of seventeen when he first linked up with the Cork minor team, before later joining the under-21 side. He made his senior debut during the 1963 championship. Cawley went on to play for the team for just two seasons. He was a Munster runner-up on one occasion.

At club level Cawley enjoyed a decade-long career with Nemo Rangers. He also lined out for Curragh Camp.

Throughout his inter-county career, Cawley made just 3 championship appearances for Cork. His retirement came following the conclusion of the 1964 championship.

Honours

Team

Cork
Munster Under-21 Football Championship (1): 1963
All-Ireland Minor Football Championship (1): 1961
Munster Minor Football Championship (1): 1961

References

1944 births
Living people
Dual players
Nemo Rangers Gaelic footballers
Nemo Rangers hurlers
Curragh Camp Gaelic footballers
Cork inter-county Gaelic footballers
Gaelic football goalkeepers
People educated at Coláiste Chríost Rí